All Souls Church is a historic church on Arkansas Highway 161, a short way north of United States Route 165 in Scott, Arkansas.  The church building is a wood-framed structure with a buttressed ashlar stone exterior and a slate roof.  It was built in 1906 to provide a meeting place and Sunday School for the local population, and has maintained a non-denominational Christian ministry since its establishment.  The church is a well-preserved example of vernacular Gothic styling in a rural setting.

The building was listed on the National Register of Historic Places in 1977.

See also
National Register of Historic Places listings in Pulaski County, Arkansas

References

External links
All Souls Church official website

Churches on the National Register of Historic Places in Arkansas
Gothic Revival church buildings in Arkansas
Churches completed in 1906
Churches in Pulaski County, Arkansas
National Register of Historic Places in Pulaski County, Arkansas
1906 establishments in Arkansas